The 1982 Can Am Series season was the fifteenth running of the Sports Car Club of America's prototype series, and the sixth running of the revived series. 1982 brought new competition for Chevrolet in the form of Hart and Cosworth. Hart would podium in three races while Cosworth would podium in two. The most dominant chassis were Frissbee, Marguey, March, VDS-001, and Ensign.  Al Unser Jr. would win at Road Atlanta, Laguna Seca, and Mosport twice, with a podium at Mid Ohio, at Riverside, and at Caesar's Palacae. Unser would be declared champion.

Bertil Roos would take the two liter class in his Hart.

Results

References

Can-Am seasons
1982 in American motorsport
1982 in Canadian motorsport